CCGS Tanu is a fisheries patrol vessel in service with the Canadian Coast Guard. The ship was constructed in 1968 by Yarrows at their yard in Esquimalt, British Columbia and entered service the same year. Home ported at Patricia Bay, British Columbia, the ship is primarily used to carry out fisheries patrols and search and rescue missions along Canada's Pacific coast.

Description
Tanu was the third of three vessels designed for fisheries patrol use on Canada's Pacific coast. Tanu had two near-sister ships,  and  all designed for fisheries patrols but differed slightly in layout.

The ship is powered by two Fairbanks Morse-38D8 geared diesel engines driving one controllable pitch propeller and bow and stern thrusters.. The vessel is also equipped with three Caterpillar C9 generators and one Perkins 2430 emergency generator. Tanu has a complement of 15 composed of 6 officers and 9 crew, with berths for an additional 16. The vessel can be equipped with two 12.7 mm machine guns.

Service history
Tanu was constructed by Yarrows with the yard number 324 at their yard in Esquimalt, British Columbia and launched in 1968. The ship was completed in September 1968 and entered service that same year. The vessel is registered in Ottawa, Ontario and is homeported at the Canadian Coast Guard base in Patricia Bay, British Columbia. The vessel is primarily tasked with performing fisheries patrols on the Canadian Pacific coast.

In October 2010, Tanu underwent a major refit performed by Allied Shipbuilders of North Vancouver, British Columbia that upgraded the two main engines to decrease emissions, installed three new generators to modernize the electrical generating system, along with new sewage treatment plant, navigation and communication equipment, galley and hospital. The vessel returned to active service in March 2011.

In April 2018, Tanu was among three Canadian Coast Guard vessels that responded to the distress call of the fishing vessel Western Commander in the Hecate Strait. Three of the crew were rescued, with a fourth dying of a heart attack during the event. The 75-year old fishing vessel which had been listing to starboard upon the Coast Guard's arrival, later sank. In July 2018, Tanu was among the Canadian Coast Guard vessels tasked with performing the largest survey of marine mammal populations in British Columbia waters. Tanu was assigned to survey Hecate Strait, Johnstone Strait, the Strait of Georgia and into Juan de Fuca Strait.

Notes

Citations

Sources
 
 
 
 

Ships built in British Columbia
Patrol vessels of the Canadian Coast Guard
1968 ships